Coptotriche berberella is a moth of the family Tischeriidae. It is found in Morocco and on the Iberian Peninsula.

References

Moths described in 1984
Tischeriidae